Suksanari School (S.N.R.) is a public school for girls located in Bangkok, Thailand. The school was founded by Somdet Phutthachan (Nuam Phutthasaramahathera), the abbot of Anongkharam Temple, on 25 June 1910. The school provides general education for students from grades 7 through 12.

History 
Suksanari School is a school that provides education in both lower secondary school and high school education. The school is a part of the Thai government education system. The founder, Somdejputthajarn (Nuam Putthasaramahatera), opened the school inside Anongkaram Temple in order to provide education for females, who had historically had not been emphasized in the Thai education system. Therefore, he opened the school and employed Mr. Toop to be a teacher.

Location 
Suksanari School is located at 176 Prajadhipok Road, Wat Kanlaya, Thonburi, Bangkok 10600

Important people  
 Somdet Putthajarn (Nuam Putthasaramahatera), founder of the school.
 Chao Phraya Borom Maha Si Suriyawongse (Choung Bunnak), landowner.
 Srinagarindra Barommarachachonnanee, Alumni of the school.

Curriculum 
The school provides education from grades 7 through 12. Each level has 12 rooms.
 Lower Secondary School
 Upper Secondary School (High School)
In this level, students must choose one of the following programs of study.

Symbol 
 Motto: Virtue, knowledge, and intellect can make people progress.
 Identity: An outstanding girls' school
 Characteristic: To be a modern Thai lady that progresses internationally.
 Flower: Tabak flowers (Bungor)
 Colors: Brown means sweetness of sugar.  Yellow, from moon's color, means the beauty of a lady.
 Policy:
 Train to be a good person.
 To create excellence in education.
 To impress the community.

References 

Schools in Bangkok
Girls' schools in Thailand
Thon Buri district